Clatsop State Forest is a state forest in Clatsop and Columbia counties in the U.S. state of Oregon.  It is managed by the Astoria District of the Oregon Department of Forestry.

References

External links 
Oregon Department of Forestry: State Forests

Oregon state forests
Protected areas of Clatsop County, Oregon
Protected areas of Columbia County, Oregon